The Australia women's national futsal team represents Australia in women's international futsal. The team is controlled by the governing body for association football in Australia, Football Federation Australia (FFA), which is currently a member of the Asian Football Confederation (AFC) and the regional ASEAN Football Federation (AFF) since leaving the Oceania Football Confederation (OFC) in 2006.

Tournament records
*Draws include knockout matches decided on penalty kicks.
**Gold background colour indicates that the tournament was won.
***Red border colour indicates tournament was held on home soil.

References

Asian women's national futsal teams
Futsal
Futsal in Australia